Typhoon Yagi was an intense typhoon, the strongest of the 2006 Pacific typhoon season, which reached the equivalence of Category 5 on the Saffir–Simpson scale. Forming out of a tropical depression on September 16, Yagi quickly strengthened as it executed a slow clockwise loop over the open waters of the western Pacific Ocean. On September 19, Yagi strengthened into a typhoon as a subtropical ridge steered the storm towards the west. Two days later, the storm reached its peak intensity with winds of  10-minute winds with a minimum pressure of 910 hPa (mbar). The typhoon gradually weakened as it recurved towards the northeast and was downgraded to a severe tropical storm on September 24 and became extratropical the next day. The storm was last noted near the Aleutian Islands on September 27. The typhoon caused severe damage on the island of Chichijima but no injuries were reported as a result of the storm.

Yagi is also tied with Glenda which became the most intense tropical cyclone in worldwide in 2006.

Meteorological history

The depression was located within an area of low to moderate wind shear under an upper-level anticyclone. Flaring convection was noted along the eastern portion of the developing system before the Joint Typhoon Warning Center (JTWC) issued a Tropical Cyclone Formation Alert later that day. Early on September 17, the JTWC began issuing advisories on Tropical Depression 16W. Located within a weak steering environment, the storm executed a clockwise loop while quickly strengthening. Several hours after the JTWC issued their first advisory, the JMA upgraded the system to a tropical storm and gave it the name Yagi; the name was contributed by Japan, and is the Japanese word for "goat". Late on September 18, the JMA upgraded Yagi to a severe tropical storm while the JTWC classified the storm as a minimal typhoon.

Early on September 19, the JMA upgraded Yagi to a typhoon. After completing the loop, Yagi's track was influenced by a subtropical ridge located to the southeast of Japan. The typhoon continued to intensify and reached its peak intensity on September 21 with winds of  10-minute winds) with a minimum pressure of 910 hPa (mbar), making it the strongest storm of the season according to the JMA. At the same time, the JTWC classified Yagi as a Category 5 super typhoon with winds of  1-minute winds). On September 22, Yagi passed by the islands of Iwo Jima and Chichijima as the storm recurved towards the northeast. With increasing wind shear, the typhoon began to weaken and also began to undergo an extratropical transition. Late on September 24, the JTWC classified the storm as an extratropical cyclone and issued their final advisory. The JMA kept Yagi as a tropical system for another day as it weakened to a severe tropical storm. Early on September 25, they classified it as extratropical. The remnants of Yagi continued towards the northeast and crossed the International Date Line on September 27. The storm was last noted near the Aleutian Islands.

Preparations and impact

On September 23, Typhoon Yagi passed directly over the resort island of Chichijima which has a population of about 2,000. About 1,000 of the 1,270 homes were without power during the height of the storm. About 150 residents evacuated to local shelters during the storm to escape the high winds and heavy rains. At least one structure was destroyed and numerous others sustained damage. The storm reportedly produced torrential rains, but there are no known measurements. Several homes had their roofs blown off and windows broken. Street lamps were knocked down by the strong winds produced by Yagi. Ferry service for several ports was cancelled for 29 days following the typhoon. Fallen trees knocked down power lines and cut communications. Some homes were reported to have lost water pressure also. The storm passed close to Iwo Jima on September 22, with the island being within the range of  winds. No loss of life or injuries were related to Typhoon Yagi.

See also

2006 Pacific typhoon season
 Timeline of the 2006 Pacific typhoon season
Typhoon Nuri (2014)

References

External links

JMA General Information of Typhoon Yagi (0614) from Digital Typhoon
JMA Best Track Data of Typhoon Yagi (0614) 
JMA Best Track Data (Graphics) of Typhoon Yagi (0614)
JMA Best Track Data (Text)
JTWC Best Track Data of Super Typhoon 16W (Yagi)
16W.YAGI from the U.S. Naval Research Laboratory

2006 Pacific typhoon season
Typhoons in Japan
Typhoon Yagi
Typhoons
Tropical cyclones in 2006